Thomas M. Melsheimer is a trial lawyer and a partner at the international law firm of Winston & Strawn, where he also serves as managing partner of its Dallas office and a member of the firm’s Executive Committee. His trial experience encompasses both civil and criminal litigation. On the civil side, he has tried to verdict cases involving patent infringement, trade secrets, insider trading, antitrust, breach of fiduciary duty, fraud, product liability, and False Claims Act (FCA) violations. On the criminal side, he has tried to verdict cases involving bank fraud, public corruption, copyright infringement, aggravated sexual assault, and kidnapping. His clients include a variety of high-net-worth individuals and notable corporations, including the Dallas Mavericks and owner Mark Cuban, Microsoft, Bank of America, and Texas Instruments. Melsheimer is the co-author of a best-selling book on trial advocacy, On the Jury Trial: Principles and Practices for Effective Advocacy

Early life
Melsheimer graduated magna cum laude from the University of Notre Dame in 1983. He later attended The University of Texas School of Law in Austin, also graduating magna cum laude in 1986. There, he served as a member of the Texas Law Review and was selected to Chancellors, the top honor society at The University of Texas School of Law. Following law school, Melsheimer served as a clerk for the Homer Thornberry at the U.S. Court of Appeals for the Fifth Circuit.

Professional career
In 1987, Melsheimer joined Akin Gump Strauss Hauer & Feld as an Associate in the Litigation Section. In 1990, he became an Assistant U.S. Attorney for the Northern District of Texas and helped successfully prosecute what was then the largest bank fraud case ever undertaken in Texas. The case involved more than $200 million in fraud Melsheimer helped obtain one of the largest RICO verdicts in Texas history. As a result, the Justice Department honored Melsheimer as one of the nation’s top prosecutors.

Since leaving public service, Melsheimer has led the creation and growth of offices for three law firms. In 1993, he co-founded a Dallas litigation boutique. In 2000, he opened the Dallas office of Fish & Richardson, a global intellectual property law firm. He served as managing partner and grew the office to more than 65 lawyers at its peak. In 2017, he helped open the Dallas office of Winston & Strawn. He currently serves as managing partner of the Dallas office, which has more than 70 lawyers.

Melsheimer’s numerous courtroom wins include notable civil and commercial litigation cases, as well as high-stakes patent infringement disputes. In addition, he has served as lead counsel or co-counsel in five cases included in The National Law Journal’s Top Verdicts of the Year for 1998, 2005, 2006, 2007 and 2009. He has been described as “one of the most sought-after trial lawyers in the country” by the publishers of The American Lawyer. and he is a fellow in The American College of Trial Lawyers and the International Academy of Trial Lawyers, and is a member of the American Board of Trial Advocates.

Notable cases
United States v DaVita, Inc and Kent Thiry

In 2022, Melsheimer represented Kent Thiry, the former CEO of the health care giant, DaVita, Inc, in the defense of a "no poach agreement" alleged to be a criminal horizontal market allocation under Section 1 of the Sherman Act. After an 8 day jury trial in federal court in Denver, the jury acquitted Melsheimer's client on all counts, handing the Department of Justice a significant setback in its efforts to prosecute criminal antitrust cases arising out of alleged anticompetitive conduct in the labor markets.

Texas Heart Hospital of the Southwest Litigation and Whistleblower Settlement

In 2020, Melsheimer was counsel for whistleblowers Dr. Mitchell Magee and Dr. Todd Dewey in a qui tam Medicare fraud case filed in the Eastern District of Texas alleging Texas Heart Hospital of the Southwest LLP and others violated the federal anti-kickback law, the physician self-referral law, and related statutes. The case resulted in a $48 million settlement and a separate award of attorney’s fees and expenses. The Department of Justice commended Drs. Magee and Dewey and their counsel for uncovering the financial arrangement between the hospital and various physicians which led to the ultimate settlement.

Forest Park Case: Lone Acquittal for One of Nine Co-Defendants in Conspiracy Trial

In 2019, Melsheimer represented Dr. Nick Nicholson, a nationally prominent bariatric

surgeon, and one of twenty-one defendants in an indictment alleging a massive conspiracy to pay and receive $40 million in health care bribes and kickbacks in connection with Forest Park Medical Center, a boutique surgical hospital. After a seven-week trial in federal court in Dallas with the nine remaining defendants, Dr. Nicholson was the only one acquitted on all charges.

Counsel for Mark Cuban

In 2013, Melsheimer served as lead trial counsel in the successful defense of Texas billionaire Mark Cuban in an insider trading fraud lawsuit filed by the U.S. Securities and Exchange Commission. The three-week trial concluded on October 16, 2013, when jurors in the U.S. District Court for the Northern District of Texas issued a unanimous verdict clearing Cuban of all claims filed by the SEC. In 2014, Melsheimer and Cuban co-authored an opinion column titled "How the Feds Rig Their Prosecutions," which criticized the SEC's conduct during its case against Cuban.

In 2011, Melsheimer successfully defended the National Basketball Association’s Dallas Mavericks and team owner Mark Cuban in a lawsuit where minority owner Ross Perot Jr. accused Cuban of mismanaging the team. Melsheimer is known for having written what observers called, “the greatest legal brief in the history of jurisprudence,” in support of this case.

Risperdal Litigation and Record Whistleblower Settlement

From 2004 to 2012, Melsheimer represented whistleblower Allen Jones in a fraud lawsuit against pharmaceutical manufacturer Johnson & Johnson and the company's Janssen division involving the anti-psychotic drug Risperdal. The case was resolved during the first week of trial in January 2012 when Johnson & Johnson and Janssen agreed to pay a $158 million settlement, the largest Medicaid fraud settlement in Texas history and the second-largest settlement in Texas during 2012. Melsheimer's role in the case against Johnson & Johnson, including his work during the trial, was featured as part of a 15-chapter article authored by legal journalist - Steven Brill and published by the Huffington Post in 2015. The case is also featured in the book, Crisis of Conscience: Whistleblowing in an Age of Fraud, by Tom Mueller.

Breach of Fiduciary Duty Jury Award

Melsheimer’s $178 million jury trial win on behalf of the plaintiff in IRCC v. NL Industries, et al., included nearly $150 million in punitive damages. The jury award in the breach of fiduciary duty case was named one of the Top Verdicts of 2009 by The National Law Journal, in addition to being recognized as one of the year’s three largest verdicts in Texas and the year’s largest verdict in Dallas County (Qualters, Sheri. “TOP VERDICTS” The National Law Journal. March 2010).

United States v. Lipscomb

In 2000, Melsheimer represented prominent Dallas civil rights leader and longtime City Council member Al Lipscomb, once called the “Jackie Robinson of Dallas city government,” in a bribery case. The district court moved the case from Dallas to Amarillo, a move Melsheimer argued was improper and unfair. After conviction, Melsheimer successfully argued for a sentence of home confinement. On appeal, the U.S. Court of Appeals for the Fifth Circuit concluded the district court had erred in moving the trial to Amarillo and reversed the conviction. The Court ordered a new trial, which never happened because the U.S. Attorney’s Office dismissed the case. In 2015, the City of Dallas renamed Grand Avenue to Al Lipscomb Way.

Recognition and awards 
Melsheimer’s litigation prowess has been recognized by numerous organizations and publications. Most notably, he was included in Best Lawyers in America from 2017 to 2021. He was also ranked as one of the “Top 100 Trial Lawyers in America,” in the 2019 and 2020 editions of Benchmark Litigation, in addition to being recognized as a “Texas Litigation Star” and “National Practice Area Star” in General Commercial Litigation. 

In 2018, 2019 and 2020 Chambers USA named him a leading Texas Trial Lawyer in Intellectual Property, General Commercial Litigation, and White-Collar Crime & Government Investigations. In addition, he has been listed in IAM’s Patent 1000.  

In 2014, Melsheimer was named the Trial Lawyer of the Year by the Texas chapters of the American Board of Trial Advocates (TEX-ABOTA).  He was also named the Dallas Bar Association Trial Lawyer of the Year, becoming the youngest recipient of the annual award since the Dallas Bar Association was founded in 1873.

Melsheimer is also well known within Texas and the Dallas business community. He was named one of the “Top 500 Business Leaders in Dallas” by D CEO magazine every year since 2016. He has also been included in D Magazine’s "Best Lawyers in Dallas" ten times.

Publications 
Thomas M. Melsheimer, “Observations on the Waco Division’s Growing Prominence,” Texas Lawyer, February 11, 2021
Thomas M. Melsheimer, Judge Eric Moyé, and Judge Craig Smith, “The Case for a Nonpolitical Federal Judiciary,” Law 360, September 22, 2020
Thomas M. Melsheimer and Paula W. Hinton, “The Remote Jury Trial is a Bad Idea,” Law 360, June 9, 2020
Thomas M. Melsheimer & Judge Craig Smith, On the Jury Trial: Principles and Practices of Effective Advocacy, University of North Texas Press, October 2017.
Stephen D. Susman & Thomas M. Melsheimer, "Trial By Agreement: A Professional Approach Improves Results and Saves the Jury System", Texas Bar Journal, October 2015.
 "A Response to 'The Collapse of the Jury Trial'", The Jury Expert: The Art and Science of Litigation Advocacy, August 28, 2015.
 Mark Cuban & Thomas M. Melsheimer, "It is time to rein in the SEC", The Washington Post, December 19, 2014.
 Stephen D. Susman & Thomas M. Melsheimer, Trial by Agreement: How Trial Lawyers Hold the Key to Improving Jury Trials in Civil Cases, 32 REV. LITIG. 431 (2013).
"Tom Melsheimer and Craig Smith: Scouts' tentative decision fails leadership challenge", The Dallas Morning News, April 25, 2013.
 "Privacy laws evolving in new era of technology", Houston Chronicle, March 23, 2012.
 "Trial's Over, But Issues Remain", Preston Hollow People newspaper, October 7, 2011.
 "Businesses' Fear of U.S. Jury System Is Irrational", Houston Chronicle, July 30, 2011.
 "Guest Column: Why 'Loser Pays' is a Loser", The Dallas Morning News, May 13, 2011.
 "Melsheimer and Smith: Hybrid bill offers best blueprint for Texas judicial selection", The Dallas Morning News, March 14, 2011.
 "Thomas Melsheimer: Pope's first step to restoring my faith", The Dallas Morning News, May 14, 2010.
 "Smith and Melsheimer: We’re all better for Merrill Hartman", The Dallas Morning News, October 25, 2010.
 "Campaign contributions: Financing order in the court", originally appeared in The Fort Worth Star-Telegram, March 20, 2010.
 "Trashing Supreme Court not appropriate for Obama", Houston Chronicle, March 2, 2010.
"Web-savvy Jurors Create New Problem for Courts", Houston Chronicle, June 21, 2009.
 "Melsheimer and Smith: One crime but not the other?" The Dallas Morning News, December 5, 2008.

References 

Living people
Jesuit College Preparatory School of Dallas alumni
University of Notre Dame alumni
University of Texas School of Law alumni
People associated with Winston & Strawn
Year of birth missing (living people)